Consignment store may mean:

Consignment store (East Asia) - collection of stalls rented by individual merchants
Consignment store in North America, where people sell their used clothing and receive money for it when a shopper at the consignment store buys the used merchandise